Bad Day to Go Fishing (original title, Mal día para pescar) is a Spanish-Uruguayan film directed by Álvaro Brechner and released in 2009. The film stars Gary Piquer, Jouko Ahola, Antonella Costa and Cesar Troncoso. It was screened as part of the official selection of the Critics Week at 2009 Cannes Film Festival.

The screenplay was written by  Álvaro Brechner in collaboration with Gary Piquer, and was adapted from a short story by the Uruguayan writer Juan Carlos Onetti.

The film tells the story of a strongman and his crafty manager, who tour small South American towns staging wrestling matches. Arriving in Santa Maria, they are met with uncommon enthusiasm by the locals, snowballing into a major challenge to their livelihood and their friendship.

Plot 

Jacob van Oppen, an East German who is the former strongest man on earth, and his manager Orsini, a scrawny yet dapper businessman who calls himself "the Prince," makes a good living by travelling around small South American towns and organizing wrestling exhibitions in run-down theaters. Jacob van Oppen is an uncontrollable titan of impressive dimensions who can only be appeased by the soft soothing melody of "Lili Marleen." Once this oddball pair disembark at the village of Santa Maria (in an unspecified country), business really kicks off: the local newspaper is immediately gung-ho on sponsoring the fight, helping hands placard posters announcing the big event and putting an open call for a worthy adversary. Ever so resourceful, Orsini knows how to find the right combatant, but fishing in Santa Maria could lead to a bigger catch than he'd hoped for... Although the cunning editor of the local newspaper is convinced to have sniffed out Orsini's secret, he very well might be on a false track...

Cast 
 Gary Piquer as Prince Orsini
 Jouko Ahola as Jacob van Oppen
 Antonella Costa as Adriana
 César Troncoso as Heber
 Roberto Pankow as el Turco
 Bruno Aldecosea as Diaz Grey

Reception 

Bad Day to Go Fishing premiered at the Critic's Week of the 2009 Cannes Film Festival.

It was the Uruguayan candidate for the Academy Award for Best Foreign Language Film.

The film won several international awards and has participated in many prestigious film festivals such as 26th Warsaw International Film Festival (Best Film Free Spirit Comp.), Montreal World Film Festival, Los Angeles Latino International Film Festival (Best Film Opera Prima), Mar del Plata Film Festival (Best Actor), Moscow International Film Festival, Shanghai International Film Festival, Austin (Best Film & Audience Award), Brooklyn (Best Director), Sofia International Film Festival (Best Film Fipresci), São Paulo, Busan International Film Festival and Palm Springs International Film Festival.

The film won 10 Uruguay Fipresci Critics Awards, including Best Film, Best International Film Debut, Best Director, Best Screenplay and Best Actor and got nominated for Best Film, Best Screenplay and Best Actor by the Spanish Critics (CEC).

References

External links 
 
 

2009 films
Spanish comedy-drama films
Uruguayan comedy-drama films
Films shot in Uruguay
2000s Spanish-language films